Fukudome (written: 福留), also transliterated as Fukutome, is a Japanese surname. Notable people with the surname include:

, Japanese baseball player
, Japanese footballer
, Japanese admiral
, Japanese modern pentathlete

Japanese-language surnames